The Tibetic languages form a well-defined group of languages descended from Old Tibetan (7th to 9th centuries). According to Tournadre (2014), there are 50 languages, which split into over 200 dialects or could be grouped into 8 dialect continua. These languages are spoken in the Tibetan Plateau and in the Himalayas in Gilgit-Baltistan, Aksai Chin, Ladakh, Nepal, Himachal Pradesh, Uttarakhand, and Bhutan. Classical Tibetan is the major literary language, particularly for its use in Buddhist literature.

Tibetan languages are spoken by some 6 million people, not all of whom are Tibetans.  With the worldwide spread of Tibetan Buddhism, the Tibetan language has spread into the western world and can be found in many Buddhist publications and prayer materials; with some western students learning the language for translation of Tibetan texts. Outside Lhasa itself, Lhasa Tibetan is spoken by approximately 200,000 exile speakers who have moved from modern-day Tibet to India and other countries. Tibetan is also spoken by groups of ethnic minorities in Tibet who have lived in close proximity to Tibetans for centuries, but nevertheless retain their own languages and cultures.

Although some of the Qiang peoples of Kham are classified by China as ethnic Tibetans (see Gyalrongic languages; Gyalrong people are identified as 'Tibetan' in China), the Qiangic languages are not Tibetan, but rather form their own branch of the Tibeto-Burman language family.

Classical Tibetan was not a tonal language, but many varieties such as Central and Khams Tibetan have developed tone registers. Amdo and Ladakhi-Balti are without tone. Tibetan morphology can generally be described as agglutinative.

Origins
Marius Zemp (2018) hypothesizes that Tibetan originated as a pidgin with the West Himalayish language Zhangzhung as its superstratum, and Rgyalrongic as its substratum (both languages are part of the broader Sino-Tibetan family). Similarly, Tamangic also has a West Himalayish superstratum, but its substratum is derived from a different Sino-Tibetan branch.

Only a few language clusters in the world are derived from a common language which is identical to or closely related to an old literary language. This small group includes the Tibetic languages, as descendents from Old Tibetan (7th–9th centuries), but also the Romance languages with Latin, the Arabic languages (or "dialects") with Classical Arabic, the Sinitic languages with Middle Chinese, the modern Indic languages with Vedic Sanskrit.

Classification

The more divergent languages are spoken in the north and east, likely due to language contact with the Qiangic, Rgyalrongic languages. The divergence exhibited in Khalong may also be due to language shift. In addition, there is Baima, which retains an apparent Qiangic substratum, and has multiple layers of borrowing from Amdo, Khams, and Zhongu, but does not correspond to any established branch of Tibetic. 

The two major Tibetic languages used for broadcasting within China are Standard Tibetan and Amdo Tibetan.

Tournadre (2014)
Tournadre (2014) classifies the Tibetic languages as eight geolinguistic continua, consisting of 50 languages and over 200 dialects. This is an updated version of his work in 2008. The Eastern and Southeastern branches have lower internal mutual intelligibility, but it is more limited in the Northwestern branch and between certain southern and northern Khams dialects. These continua are spread across five countries with one exception, this being Sangdam, a Khams dialect in Kachin, Myanmar.

North-Western: Ladakhi, Zangskari, Balti, Purki
Western: Spiti, Garzha, Khunu, Jad
Central: Dbus, Tsang, Phenpo, Lhokha, Tö, Kongpo (in Kongpo with Basum)
South-Western: Sherpa and Jirel; other languages/dialects along the Sino-Nepalese border: Humla, Mugu, Dolpo, Lo-ke, Nubri, Tsum, Langtang, Kyirong, Yolmo, Gyalsumdo, Kagate, Lhomi, Walungge, Tokpe Gola.
Southern: Dzongkha, Drengjong, Tsamang, Dhromo Lakha, Dur Brokkat, Mera Sakteng Brokpa-ke
South-Eastern: Hor Nagchu, Hor Bachen, Yushu, Pembar, Rongdrak, Minyak, Dzayul, Derong-Jol, Chaktreng, Muli-Dappa, Semkyi Nyida
'Northern route' dialects: 'Chamdo (Chab-mdo), Derge (sde-dge), and Kandze (dkar-mdzes)
'Southern route' dialects: Markham (smar-khams), Bathang ('ba'-thang), Lithang (li-thang)
Eastern: Drugchu, Khöpokhok, Thewo-Chone, Baima, Sharkhok, Palkyi (or Pashi; four dialects, including Chos-rje), and Zhongu
North-Eastern
Amdo
Gser-Rdo: Gserpa, Khalong

Tournadre (2005, 2008)
Tournadre (2005) classifies the Tibetic languages as follows.

Central Tibetan
The basis of Standard Tibetan that includes various Nepalese varieties
Khams 
Amdo 
Dzongkha–Lhokä
Dzongkha, Sikkimese, Lakha, Naapa, Chocangaca, Brokkat, Brokpa and probably Groma
Ladakhi–Balti
Ladakhi, Burig, Zangskari, Balti
Lahuli–Spiti
Kyirong–Kagate 
Sherpa–Jirel
Sherpa, Jirel

The other languages (Thewo-Chone, Zhongu, Khalong, Dongwang, Gserpa, Zitsadegu, Drugchu, Baima) are not mutually intelligible, but are not known well enough to classify.

Tournadre (2013) adds Tseku and Khamba to Khams, and groups Thewo-Chone, Zhongu, Baima as an Eastern branch of Tibetic.

Bradley (1997)
According to Bradley, the languages cluster as follows (dialect information from the Tibetan Dialects Project at the University of Bern):

Western Archaic Tibetan (non-tonal), including Ladakhi, Balti and Burig
Amdo Tibetan (including Thewo-Chone) (non-tonal)
Khams Tibetan (tonal)
Western Innovative Tibetan (Lahuli–Spiti) (slightly tonal)
Dialects of Upper Ladakh and Zanskar, of the Northwest Indian Border Area (Lahaul and Spiti district and Uttarakhand), and of Zanda County (westernmost Tibet)
Central Tibetan (slightly tonal)
Most dialects of Ngari Prefecture in western Tibet, of the northern Nepalese border area in Nepal, Tsang dialects of Shigatse Prefecture, and Ü dialects (Lhokha, Lhasa, etc.). The basis of Standard Tibetan. 
Northern Tibetan (slightly tonal)
Dialects of Gêrzê, of Nagqu Prefecture in north-central Tibet, and of Nangqên County in South Qinghai(Considered dialects of Khams by Tournadre)
Southern Tibetan (slightly tonal)
Groma language of Chumbi Valley in southern Tsang, Sikkimese in India, Sherpa and Jirel in Nepal, and various languages of Bhutan:Dzongkha, Brokkat, Brokpa, Chocangaca, Lakha, Laya dialect, Lunana dialect.

Other
Some classifications group Khams and Amdo together as Eastern Tibetan (not to be confused with East Bodish, whose speakers are not ethnically Tibetan). Some, like Tournadre, break up Central Tibetan. Phrases such as 'Central Tibetan' and 'Central Bodish' may or may not be synonymous: Southern (Central) Tibetan can be found as Southern Bodish, for example; 'Central Tibetan' may mean dBus or all tonal lects apart from Khams; 'Western Bodish' may be used for the non-tonal western lects while 'Western Tibetan' is used for the tonal lects, or 'Bodish' may even be used for other branches of the Tibeto-Kanauri languages.

Writing systems 

Most Tibetic languages are written in one of two Indic scripts. Standard Tibetan and most other Tibetic languages are written in the Tibetan script with a historically conservative orthography (see below) that helps unify the Tibetan-language area. Some other Tibetan languages (in India and Nepal) are written in the related Devanagari script, which is also used to write Hindi, Nepali and many other languages. However, some Ladakhi and Balti speakers write with the Urdu script; this occurs almost exclusively in Pakistan. The Tibetan script fell out of use in Pakistani Baltistan hundreds of years ago upon the region's adoption of Islam. However, increased concern among Balti people for the preservation of their language and traditions, especially in the face of strong Punjabi cultural influence throughout Pakistan, has fostered renewed interest in reviving the Tibetan script and using it alongside the Perso-Arabic script. Many shops in Baltistan's capital Skardu in Pakistan's "Northern Areas" region have begun supplementing signs written in the Perso-Arabic script with signs written in the Tibetan script. Baltis see this initiative not as separatist but rather as part of an attempt to preserve the cultural aspects of their region which has shared a close history with neighbours like Kashmiris and Punjabis since the arrival of Islam in the region many centuries ago.

Historical phonology 
Old Tibetan phonology is rather accurately rendered by the script. The finals were pronounced devoiced although they are written as voiced, the prefix letters assimilated their voicing to the root letters. The graphic combinations hr and lh represent voiceless and not necessarily aspirate correspondences to r and l respectively. The letter ' was pronounced as a voiced guttural fricative before vowels but as homorganic prenasalization before consonants. Whether the gigu verso had phonetic meaning or not remains controversial.

For instance, Srongbtsan Sgampo would have been pronounced  (now pronounced  in Lhasa Tibetan) and 'babs would have been pronounced  (pronounced  in Lhasa Tibetan).

Already in the 9th century the process of cluster simplification, devoicing and tonogenesis had begun in the central dialects can be shown with Tibetan words transliterated in other languages, particularly Middle Chinese but also Uyghur.

The concurrence of the evidence indicated above enables us to form the following outline of the evolution of Tibetan. In the 9th century, as shown by the bilingual Tibetan–Chinese treaty of 821–822 found in front of Lhasa's Jokhang, the complex initial clusters had already been reduced, and the process of tonogenesis was likely well underway.

The next change took place in Tsang (Gtsang) dialects: The ra-tags were altered into retroflex consonants, and the ya-tags became palatals.

Later on the superscribed letters and finals d and s disappeared, except in the east and west. It was at this stage that the language spread in Lahul and Spiti, where the superscribed letters were silent, the d and g finals were hardly heard, and as, os, us were ai, oi, ui. The words introduced from Tibet into the border languages at that time differ greatly from those introduced at an earlier period.

The other changes are more recent and restricted to Ü and Tsang. In Ü, the vowel sounds  a, o, u have now mostly umlauted to ä, ö, ü when followed by the coronal sounds i, d, s, l and n. The same holds for Tsang with the exception of l which merely lengthens the vowel. The medials have become aspirate tenues with a low intonation, which also marks the words having a simple initial consonant; while the former aspirates and the complex initials simplified in speech are uttered with a high tone, shrill and rapidly.

Reconstruction

Proto-Tibetic
Proto-Tibetic, the hypothetical proto-language ancestral to the Tibetic languages, has been reconstructed by Tournadre (2014). Proto-Tibetic is similar to, but not identical to, written Classical Literary Tibetan. The following phonological features are characteristic of Proto-Tibetic (Tournadre 2014: 113).
The prefixes *s(ǝ)-, *d(ǝ)-/g(ǝ)-, *m(ǝ)-, and *b(ǝ)-, which have been retained from Proto-Tibeto-Burman. *s(ǝ)- is primarily used with animals and body parts, as well as *d(ǝ)-/*g(ǝ)- and *m(ǝ)-/*r(ǝ)-.
Palatalization of dental and alveolar consonants before y (/j/).
Consonant change from lateral to dental position after /m/ (e.g., *ml > *md).
Distinctive aspirated initial stops. This phenomenon is attested by alternating aspirated and non-aspirated consonants in Old Tibetan orthography. Examples include gcig ~ gchig (གཅིག་ ~ གཆིག་) 'one'; phyin-chad ~ phyin-cad (ཕྱིན་ཆད་ ~ ཕྱིན་ཅད་) 'from now on'; ci ~ chi (ཅི་ ~ ཆི་) 'what'; and cu ~ chu (ཅུ་ ~ ཆུ་) 'water'.

Reconstructed Proto-Tibetic forms from Tournadre (2014) include:

 *g(ǝ)-tɕik 'one'
 *g(ǝ)-nyis 'two'
 *g(ǝ)-su- 'three'
 *b(ǝ)-ʑi 'four'
 *l(ǝ)-ŋa 'five'
 *d(ǝ)-ruk 'six'
 *b(ǝ)-dun 'seven'
 *b(ǝ)-rgyat 'eight'
 *d(ǝ)-gu 'nine'
 *b(ǝ)-tɕu 'ten'
 *s(ǝ)-dik-pa 'scorpion'
 *s(ǝ)-bal 'frog'
 *s(ǝ)-tak 'tiger'
 *s(ǝ)-b-rul 'snake'
 *s(ǝ)-pra 'monkey'
 *s(ǝ)-kra 'hair'
 *s(ǝ)-nyiŋ 'heart'
 *s(ǝ)-na 'nose'
 *d(ǝ)-myik 'eye'
 *m(ǝ)-go 'head'
 *r(ǝ)-na 'ear'

Pre-Tibetic
Pre-Tibetic is a hypothetical pre-formation stage of Proto-Tibetic.

*ty-, *ly-, *sy- were not palatalized in Pre-Tibetic, but underwent palatalization in Proto-Tibetic (Tournadre 2014: 113-114). Posited sound changes from Pre-Tibetic to Proto-Tibetic include *ty- > *tɕ-, *sy- > *ɕ-, *tsy- > *tɕ-, and *ly- > *ʑ-. However, Tournadre (2014: 114) notes that many Bodish languages such as Basum, Tamang, and Kurtöp (East Bodish) have not undergone these changes (e.g., Bake (Basum) ti 'what' vs. Proto-Tibetic *tɕ(h)i and Bake tɨ 'one' vs. Proto-Tibetic *g(ǝ)-tɕ(h)ik; Kurtöp Hla: 'iron' and Bumthap lak 'iron' vs. Proto-Tibetic *ltɕaks).

Some Pre-Tibetic reconstructions, along with reconstructed Proto-Tibetic forms and orthographic Classical Literary Tibetan, from Tournadre (2014: 114-116) are listed below.

Comparisons of Numerals 
The Numerals in different Tibetan/Tibetic languages are:

The numbers include the tonelevel. For the middle or eastern languages:

References

Further reading 

 

AHP43 Amdo Tibetan Language

External links 

Comparative Dictionary of Tibetan Dialects (CDTD)
Languages on the Tibetan Plateau and the Himalayas — Nicolas Tournadre
Overview of Old Tibetan Synchronic phonology by Nathan Hill
L'évolution des langues et les facteurs écolinguistiques : le cas des langues d'éleveurs et des langues d'agriculteurs sur le Haut Plateau tibétain at CNRS-LACITO
China's Tibet policy continued attempt at erasing Tibetan language

Languages attested from the 7th century
Agglutinative languages
Languages of China
Bodic languages
Languages of Tibet
Languages of Bhutan
Languages of Nepal
Languages of Pakistan
Languages of India